Jaheel Hyde (born 2 February 1997) is a Jamaican track and field athlete. He was the 2014 world junior champion in the 400 metres hurdles and the 2013 world youth champion in the 110 metres hurdles.

He won a gold medal in the 110 m hurdles at the 2013 World Youth Championships in Athletics in Donetsk, Ukraine, setting a new championship record for the event and coming .01 seconds shy of tying the World Youth Best held by Wilhem Belocian. In 2014, he won the gold medal in the 400 metres hurdles at the World Junior Championships in Eugene, Oregon, then the 100 metres hurdles at the Youth Olympics in Nanjing, China, beating Belocian's World Youth Best with a time of 12.96 seconds.

His parents, Lenworth Hyde and Angela Hussett, encouraged their children to participate in sport. His father was an international footballer for Jamaica for over ten years. His older brothers have also been involved in sport: Lenworth Jr. and Jamie both played football for Jamaica at age category level while Julian Hyde won international medals in equestrian sports. Hyde has also played for the Jamaican football team and scored a hat-trick against Bermuda in an under-17s international match in 2012.

Personal bests

Competition record

1: Exhibition event (no medals).
2: Competed only in the heat.

References

External links

 

1997 births
Living people
Jamaican male sprinters
Jamaican male hurdlers
Jamaican footballers
People from Spanish Town
Athletes (track and field) at the 2014 Summer Youth Olympics
Athletes (track and field) at the 2016 Summer Olympics
Athletes (track and field) at the 2018 Commonwealth Games
Olympic athletes of Jamaica
World Athletics Championships athletes for Jamaica
Commonwealth Games medallists in athletics
Commonwealth Games bronze medallists for Jamaica
Association footballers not categorized by position
Youth Olympic gold medalists for Jamaica
Youth Olympic gold medalists in athletics (track and field)
Athletes (track and field) at the 2020 Summer Olympics
20th-century Jamaican people
21st-century Jamaican people
Medallists at the 2018 Commonwealth Games